Leone Bertimon (born 16 August 1950 at Pointe-Noire) is a former French athlete, who specialised in the shot put.

Biography  
Léone measured 1.78 m and weighed 76 kg when competing. She competed for club Bouillante up to 1972, and since 1973 she competed in France at VGA Saint-Maur.

She won 21 titles French Athletics Championships: 12 outdoor (1974 to 1989), and 9 indoor (1973–1988). Her only rival was at that time was Frenchwomen Simone Créantor.

She also played in the reserve basketball team of her club, at Saint-Maur. Her brother, Charlus Bertimon was the French record holder of the javelin throw four times.

Bertimon Leone has been a physical education teacher at Louis Blanc college of St Maur Des Fosses, in Val de Marne.

International competitions
    gold medal Francophone Games in 1989 (39 years)
    gold medal Mediterranean Games in 1979
  Participation in 11 European Cups (French record) from 1973–1991
  69 caps for France A over 24 years (women's record) from 1972–1995

National records
 Record holder of France 6 times, for 10 years, with an increase of 1.85 m; 2 times in 1973, 1975 3 times, and 1977 with 17.16 m
 Holder of the Indoor record in France 1981, at 16.77 m
 Record holder of France veteran -in Shot Put 4 in 3 age groups: F40 in 1991, in 1996 F45 and F50 in 2001

National titles
    Champion of France from 1973 to 1980, then in 1982, 1983, 1984 and 1989. All together 12 titles.
    France champion indoors in 1973 1974,  1976,  1978,  1980,  1981, 1982,  1987 and 1988. All together 9 titles.
    Junior Champion of France: once

References

Living people
1950 births
People from Pointe-Noire, Guadeloupe
French female shot putters
Mediterranean Games gold medalists for France
Mediterranean Games medalists in athletics
Athletes (track and field) at the 1979 Mediterranean Games